Lautaro Damián Cosme Robles (born 26 July 1985) is an Argentine professional footballer who plays as a forward for Defensores de Pronunciamiento.

Career
Robles played for ADEV's youth, prior to moving into senior football with clubs including ADEV and Barrio Norte de Gualeguay; who he left in 2010 to rejoin ADEV. In 2011, Robles joined Torneo Argentino B side Defensores de Pronunciamiento. He remained for six years and made one hundred and fifteen appearances whilst scoring forty-four goals in the fourth tier, either side of a season in Torneo Federal C. On 30 June 2017, after nineteen goals in his final two campaigns with Defensores de Pronunciamiento, Torneo Federal A side Gimnasia y Esgrima signed Robles. He scored ten times in 2017–18.

In June 2018, Robles completed a move to Central Córdoba of Primera B Nacional. His professional debut arrived on 2 September against Independiente Rivadavia, which preceded his first pro goal during a draw with Olimpo in the following November. After securing promotion with Central Córdoba, Robles departed in July 2019 to Sarmiento of Torneo Federal A. He scored goals against San Martín Formosa and Boca Unidos in five months with the club, prior to securing a return to Defensores de Pronunciamiento in January 2020. He netted a brace on debut in the cup versus Crucero del Norte.

Career statistics
.

References

External links

1985 births
Living people
Sportspeople from Entre Ríos Province
Argentine footballers
Association football forwards
Torneo Argentino B players
Torneo Federal A players
Primera Nacional players
Gimnasia y Esgrima de Concepción del Uruguay footballers
Central Córdoba de Santiago del Estero footballers
Sarmiento de Resistencia footballers